Blipta is a genus of moths in the Carposinidae family.

Species
Blipta technica Diakonoff, 1954
Blipta xylinarcha (Meyrick, 1930) (originally in Bondia)

References

Natural History Museum Lepidoptera generic names catalog

Carposinidae
Moth genera